The 2016–17 season was 7th season in the top Ukrainian football league for Zirka Kropyvnytskyi. Zirka competed in Premier League and in the Ukrainian Cup.

Players

Squad information

Transfers

In

Out

Pre-season and friendlies

Competitions

Overall

Last updated:

Premier League

League table

Results summary

Results by round

Matches

Ukrainian Cup

Statistics

Appearances and goals

|-
! colspan=14 style=background:#dcdcdc; text-align:center| Goalkeepers

|-
! colspan=14 style=background:#dcdcdc; text-align:center| Defenders

|-
! colspan=14 style=background:#dcdcdc; text-align:center| Midfielders 

|-
! colspan=14 style=background:#dcdcdc; text-align:center| Forwards

|-
! colspan=14 style=background:#dcdcdc; text-align:center| Players transferred out during the season

|-

Last updated: 31 May 2017

Goalscorers

Last updated: 31 May 2017

Clean sheets

Last updated: 20 May 2017

Disciplinary record

Last updated: 31 May 2017

References

External links 
 Official Club website

FC Zirka Kropyvnytskyi
Zirka Kropyvnytskyi